Ihor Mykolayovych Prasolov (born 4 February 1962) is a Russian-born Ukrainian politician. He served as a Minister of Economical Development and Trade of Ukraine from 24 December 2012 till 27 February 2014.

Biography

Prasolov was born on 4 February 1962 in Peschany, Murmansk Oblast, Russia.

Education
 1982 – 1987  – Rostov State University named after Mikhail Suslov, majoring in political economics, graduated with qualification of economist, lecturer of political economics.
 1990 – 1993 – Donetsk State University, postgraduate studies.

Career
 1979–1980 – electrical fitter trainee, electrical fitter at Novocherkassk power plant
 1980–1982 – military service in Soviet Army, was discharged with the rank of staff sergeant
 1987–1993 – Assistant Professor of Political Economy department at Donetsk State University
 1993–2000 – General Director of CJSC Investment Company "Keramet Invest"
 2000–2005 – General Director of JSC System Capital Management

Politics
 2006 – 2007 – People's Deputy of Ukraine of the 5th Verkhovna Rada, was elected from the Party of Regions, No. 43 on the list
 November 2007 – elected as People's Deputy of the 6th Verkhovna Rada, from the Party of Regions, No. 43 on the list
 Chairman of the Subcommittee on Securities and Stock Market, Committee of the Verkhovna Rada of Ukraine on Finance, Banking, Tax and Customs Policy
 Member of the Group for Interparliamentary Relations with Russian Federation
 Member of the Group for Interparliamentary Relations with the Republic of Belarus
 Member of the Group for Interparliamentary Relations with the Czech Republic

Family
 spouse Natalia Prasolova (b. 1961) is administrative director of Pershe Dzherelo (eng.- First Source) company
 daughter Christina Prasolova, born 28 September 1989
 son Dmitry Prasolov, born 27 July 1999.

See also
2007 Ukrainian parliamentary election
List of Ukrainian Parliament Members 2007

References

1962 births
Living people
People from Kolsky District
Ukrainian people of Russian descent
Party of Regions politicians
Economic development and trade ministers of Ukraine
Fifth convocation members of the Verkhovna Rada
Sixth convocation members of the Verkhovna Rada
Seventh convocation members of the Verkhovna Rada